Rissoa verdensis is a species of minute sea snail, a marine gastropod mollusk or micromollusk in the family Rissoidae.

Description

Distribution
This species can be found in the Atlantic Ocean off the Cape Verde islands.

References

Rissoidae
Gastropods of Cape Verde
Gastropods described in 2008